Israel was present at the Eurovision Song Contest 1989, held in Lausanne, Switzerland. The Israeli broadcaster IBA continued to use a national final, Kdam Eurovision, to select their entry.

Before Eurovision

Kdam Eurovision 1989 
The final was hosted by Moshe Beker and Shira Gera. 12 songs competed in the final held on 30 March 1989, where regional televoting chose the winner. Members of the public were phoned at random and were asked for their favourite song. These results were converted into votes for 6 regions of Israel.

The winner was Gili Netanel and Galit Burg-Michael with the song "Derekh Hamelekh".

At Eurovision
Netanel and Burg-Michael performed 2nd on the night of the contest, following Italy and preceding Ireland. At the close of the voting it had received 50 points, placing 12th in a field of 22.

Voting

References 

1989
Countries in the Eurovision Song Contest 1989
Eurovision